Beck Foot is a hamlet in Cumbria, England, situated on the B6257 road south of Lowgill, the West Coast Main Line and M6 motorway. The disused Lowgill Viaduct is close by.

Villages in Cumbria
South Lakeland District